Dubrovsky is a rural locality (a khutor) and the administrative center of Dubrovskoye Rural Settlement, Kikvidzensky District, Volgograd Oblast, Russia. The population was 597 as of 2010. There are 4 streets.

Geography 
Dubrovsky is located on Khopyorsko-Buzulukskaya plain, on the right bank of the Buzuluk River, 15 km west of Preobrazhenskaya (the district's administrative centre) by road. Rasstrigin is the nearest rural locality.

References 

Rural localities in Kikvidzensky District